John Whitaker Lord Jr. (December 19, 1901 – May 16, 1972) was an American politician and judge from Pennsylvania.  He served as a Republican member of the Pennsylvania Senate for the 6th district from 1947 to 1951 and the Philadelphia City Council from 1952 to 1954.  He served as a United States district judge of the United States District Court for the Eastern District of Pennsylvania from 1954 until his death in 1972.

Early life and education
Lord was born in the Germantown neighborhood of Philadelphia, Pennsylvania.  He graduated from Germantown High School and the University of Pennsylvania. He received a Bachelor of Laws from Temple University Beasley School of Law in 1928.

Career
He entered private practice in 1928 with the firm of Brown and Williams (later White and Williams) and remained associated with them until his elevation to the bench in 1954. Lord also worked as a law professor at Temple University from 1938 to 1954, as well as lecturing on medical jurisprudence at Hahnemann Medical College. He was a deputy state attorney general of Pennsylvania from 1939 to 1946. He served as a Republican member of the Pennsylvania State Senate for the 6th district from 1947 to 1951. In 1951, he was elected as one of seven at-large members of the Philadelphia City Council and served from 1952 to 1954.

Federal judicial service

Lord was nominated by President Dwight D. Eisenhower on March 29, 1954, to a seat on the United States District Court for the Eastern District of Pennsylvania vacated by Judge James P. McGranery. He was confirmed by the United States Senate on May 18, 1954, and received his commission on May 20, 1954. He served as Chief Judge from 1969 to 1971. He assumed senior status on December 19, 1971. Lord served in that capacity until his death on May 16, 1972, after collapsing while attending a Temple Law alumni dinner.

He is interred at the Saint Timothy's Episcopal Church Cemetery in the Roxborough section of Philadelphia, Pennsylvania.

References

Sources
 
 

|-

1901 births
1972 deaths
20th-century American judges
20th-century American lawyers
20th-century American politicians
Judges of the United States District Court for the Eastern District of Pennsylvania
Lawyers from Philadelphia
Pennsylvania Republicans
Philadelphia City Council members
Politicians from Philadelphia
Temple University Beasley School of Law alumni
United States district court judges appointed by Dwight D. Eisenhower
University of Pennsylvania alumni